Valentino Fioravanti (11 September 1764 – 16 June 1837) was a celebrated Italian composer of opera buffas.
 
Fioravanti was born in Rome.  One of the best opera buffa composers between Domenico Cimarosa and Gioacchino Rossini, he was especially popular in Naples, and was the first in Italy to introduce spoken dialogue in the French manner in his works, sometimes using the Neapolitan dialect. His works included some 70 operas, the most famous being Le cantatrici villane from 1799. He died, aged 72, in Capua.

His eldest son, Giuseppe Fioravanti, was a successful opera singer, and his younger son, Vincenzo Fioravanti (1799–1877), also became a celebrated opera buffa composer, writing 35 stage works. His grandsons, Valentino (1827–79) and Luigi (1829–87), had successful opera careers, both as basso buffos.

Works
The following appear in the extensive list of works by Fiorvanti which appear in Sadie. 

Camilla
Il furbo contr'il furbo 
Il fabbro Parigino
I virtuosi ambulanti
I viaggiatori ridicoli 
Le cantatrici villane

References
Anderson, James (1993), The Complete Dictionary of Opera and Operetta, Wings Books. 
Tartak, Marvin (work list: John Black) (1998), "Fioravanti, Valentino", in Stanley Sadie, (Ed.), The New Grove Dictionary of Opera, Vol. Two, p. 216. London: Macmillan Publishers, Inc.

External links
 
 X. Y. Z. | ovvero | Il Riconoscimento | commedia lirica in due atti, 1846 publication, Italian, digitized by BYU on archive.org

1764 births
1837 deaths
Italian classical composers
Italian male classical composers
Italian opera composers
Male opera composers